Topical tobacco paste is a home remedy sometimes recommended as a treatment for wasp, hornet, fire ant, scorpion or bee stings,  though there is no scientific evidence that this home remedy works to relieve pain. For about 2 percent of people, allergic reactions can be life-threatening and require emergency treatment.

References

Tobacco
Traditional medicine